Comorian may refer to:
 Something of or pertaining to the Comoro Islands, a region of Africa including Comoros
 Something or someone of, from, or related to Comoros, a country in the Comoro Islands
 Comorian language, a set of Sabaki dialects (Bantu language)

See also 
 

Language and nationality disambiguation pages